The 1998–99 NBA season was the 29th season for the Portland Trail Blazers in the National Basketball Association. On March 23, 1998, the owners of all 29 NBA teams voted 27–2 to reopen the league's collective bargaining agreement, seeking changes to the league's salary cap system, and a ceiling on individual player salaries. The National Basketball Players Association (NBPA) opposed to the owners' plan, and wanted raises for players who earned the league's minimum salary. After both sides failed to reach an agreement, the owners called for a lockout, which began on July 1, 1998, putting a hold on all team trades, free agent signings and training camp workouts, and cancelling many NBA regular season and preseason games. Due to the lockout, the NBA All-Star Game, which was scheduled to be played in Philadelphia on February 14, 1999, was also cancelled. However, on January 6, 1999, NBA commissioner David Stern, and NBPA director Billy Hunter finally reached an agreement to end the lockout. The deal was approved by both the players and owners, and was signed on January 20, ending the lockout after 204 days. The regular season began on February 5, and was cut short to just 50 games instead of the regular 82-game schedule.

During the off-season, the Blazers signed free agents Jim Jackson and Greg Anthony, who would reunite with his former UNLV teammate Stacey Augmon, and acquired top draft pick Bonzi Wells from the Detroit Pistons. The Blazers got off to a fast start winning eight straight games between February and March, on their way to a 27–6 start. Despite losing four of their final five games, the team finished 35–15 in the lockout-shortened season, earning their fourth Pacific Division title and the first since 1991–92. Their record qualified them for the #2 seed in the Western Conference. The team earned their 17th straight trip to the playoffs, and 22nd in 23 years.

Isaiah Rider led the team in scoring with 13.9 points per game, which is usually a low average in points for a team's scoring leader, while Rasheed Wallace played half the season off the bench, averaging 12.8 points per game, and Damon Stoudamire contributed 12.6 points and 6.2 assists per game. In addition, Brian Grant averaged 11.5 points and 9.8 rebounds per game, while Arvydas Sabonis provided the team with 12.1 points and 7.9 rebounds per game, Walt Williams contributed 9.3 points per game, and Jackson provided with 8.4 points per game off the bench. Head coach Mike Dunleavy was named Coach of the Year, and Wallace finished in second place in Sixth Man of the Year voting.

The Blazers swept the Phoenix Suns in the Western Conference First Round in three straight games, marking the first time since 1992 that the Blazers advanced to the playoffs. They followed with a 4–2 series victory over the two-time defending Western Conference champion Utah Jazz in the Western Conference Semi-finals, but were swept out of the Western Conference Finals by Tim Duncan and the eventual NBA champion San Antonio Spurs in four straight games. The Spurs would reach the NBA Finals for the first time to defeat the 8th-seeded New York Knicks in five games, winning their first ever championship.

Following the season, Rider and Jackson were both traded to the Atlanta Hawks, and Williams and second-year center Kelvin Cato were both traded to the Houston Rockets.

Draft picks
The Trail Blazers did not own any picks in the 1998 NBA draft.

Roster

Regular season

Season standings

z – clinched division title
y – clinched division title
x – clinched playoff spot

Record vs. opponents

Game log

Playoffs

| home_wins = 2
| home_losses = 0
| road_wins = 1
| road_losses = 0
}}
|- align="center" bgcolor="#ccffcc"
| 1
| May 8
| Phoenix
| W 95–85
| Isaiah Rider (25)
| Brian Grant (10)
| Arvydas Sabonis (8)
| Rose Garden20,040
| 1–0
|- align="center" bgcolor="#ccffcc"
| 2
| May 10
| Phoenix
| W 110–99
| Grant, Stoudamire (22)
| Arvydas Sabonis (9)
| Damon Stoudamire (13)
| Rose Garden20,588
| 2–0
|- align="center" bgcolor="#ccffcc"
| 3
| May 12
| @ Phoenix
| W 103–93
| Brian Grant (20)
| Arvydas Sabonis (11)
| Damon Stoudamire (7)
| America West Arena17,306
| 3–0
|-

| home_wins = 3
| home_losses = 0
| road_wins = 1
| road_losses = 2
}}
|- align="center" bgcolor="#ffcccc"
| 1
| May 18
| @ Utah
| L 83–93
| Brian Grant (19)
| Arvydas Sabonis (11)
| Damon Stoudamire (5)
| Delta Center19,911
| 0–1
|- align="center" bgcolor="#ccffcc"
| 2
| May 20
| @ Utah
| W 84–81
| Isaiah Rider (27)
| Arvydas Sabonis (14)
| Damon Stoudamire (6)
| Delta Center19,911
| 1–1
|- align="center" bgcolor="#ccffcc"
| 3
| May 22
| Utah
| W 97–87
| Rasheed Wallace (20)
| Brian Grant (15)
| Isaiah Rider (8)
| Rose Garden20,720
| 2–1
|- align="center" bgcolor="#ccffcc"
| 4
| May 23
| Utah
| W 81–75
| Isaiah Rider (24)
| Arvydas Sabonis (15)
| Greg Anthony (3)
| Rose Garden20,720
| 3–1
|- align="center" bgcolor="#ffcccc"
| 5
| May 25
| @ Utah
| L 71–88
| Isaiah Rider (16)
| Brian Grant (10)
| Damon Stoudamire (6)
| Delta Center19,911
| 3–2
|- align="center" bgcolor="#ccffcc"
| 6
| May 27
| Utah
| W 92–80
| Isaiah Rider (24)
| Brian Grant (12)
| Jim Jackson (6)
| Rose Garden20,727
| 4–2
|-

| home_wins = 0
| home_losses = 2
| road_wins = 0
| road_losses = 2
}}
|- align="center" bgcolor="#ffcccc"
| 1
| May 29
| @ San Antonio
| L 76–80
| Rasheed Wallace (28)
| Rasheed Wallace (8)
| Damon Stoudamire (8)
| Alamodome35,165
| 0–1
|- align="center" bgcolor="#ffcccc"
| 2
| May 31
| @ San Antonio
| L 85–86
| Arvydas Sabonis (17)
| Grant, Sabonis (7)
| Damon Stoudamire (7)
| Alamodome35,260
| 0–2
|- align="center" bgcolor="#ffcccc"
| 3
| June 4
| San Antonio
| L 63–85
| Rasheed Wallace (22)
| Brian Grant (13)
| Stoudamire, Williams (3)
| Rose Garden20,732
| 0–3
|- align="center" bgcolor="#ffcccc"
| 4
| June 6
| San Antonio
| L 80–94
| Damon Stoudamire (21)
| Arvydas Sabonis (7)
| three players tied (4)
| Rose Garden20,735
| 0–4
|-

Player statistics

NOTE: Please write the players statistics in alphabetical order by last name.

Season

Playoffs

Awards and honors
 Mike Dunleavy, NBA Coach of the Year

Transactions

References

Portland Trail Blazers seasons
Portland Trail Blazers 1998
Portland Trail Blazers 1998
Port
Port
Port